Algimantas Merkevičius (born 3 January 1969) is a Lithuanian judoka.

Achievements

References
 

1969 births
Living people
Lithuanian taekwondo practitioners
Lithuanian male judoka
Olympic judoka of Lithuania
Judoka at the 1996 Summer Olympics